Jerry Schaefer (born 1979) is a Canadian actor who is best known for his role as Possum Lake animal control officer Ed Frid on The Red Green Show.

Career
Jerry is a veteran of The Second City, where he continues to work as an instructor. As a member of the comedy troupe The Chumps, he helped create and perform several long-running pop culture parodies and a series of improvised one-act plays. They also improvised a series for CBC Radio.

In film, Schaefer has worked with Carl Reiner and Bette Midler in That Old Feeling, with Bruce McCulloch and Natasha Henstridge in Dog Park, and with Angelina Jolie in Pushing Tin.

Schaefer's television credits include The Kids in the Hall, That’s So Weird, Comics!, Degrassi: The Next Generation, The Ron James Show, Dan for Mayor, SketchCom, Due South and Howie Do It with Howie Mandel. He is also a regular character on The Red Green Show, where he plays Ed Frid, an animal control expert who is deathly afraid of all animals.

Schaefer was head writer for the CBC Radio comedy series The Muckraker. He also wrote and produced satirical, current event comedy for What a Week.

Personal life
When he is not acting, Schaefer is teaching workshops on improv and sketch comedy writing. Most recently, Schaefer improvised a show with noted Beat poet Ken Nordine at the Chicago Improv Festival.

From time to time, Schaefer is paid to appear in commercials to please his parents.

Filmography
Clarity (short) (2011) (completed)
Clown Therapy (short) (2010)
Survival of the Dead (2009)
Cake (2005)
Secondary High (2002)
Duct Tape Forever (2002)
Dick (1999)
Dog Park (1998)
That Old Feeling (1997)
Tommy Boy (1995)

References

External links 

1979 births
Male actors from Toronto
Canadian male film actors
Canadian male television actors
Living people